Kamakshi Movies is an Indian film production company established by D.Shiva Prasad Reddy, an Indian film producer. Kamakshi Movies was founded by Reddy in 1987. Ever since its inception, the production house has committed itself to making quality cinema. The banner believes in sensible entertainment, and its cinema is imbued in pure Telugu nativity. Many top heroes and heroines a wide range of actors and technicians have worked under their banner over the years for their films. The company is based in Hyderabad. Shiva Prasad Reddy has produced several Telugu films under this company and several films have been distributed. Telugu movies produced by the company include Mutha Mestri, Nenunnanu, King, Seetharama Raju and Allari Alludu.

Filmography

Production

Distribution

References

External links
 
 
 

Indian companies established in 1987
Film production companies based in Hyderabad, India
Film distributors of India
1987 establishments in Andhra Pradesh